The 2019 Las Vegas Challenger was a professional tennis tournament played on hard courts. It was the fifth edition of the revamped tournament which was the part of the 2019 ATP Challenger Tour. It took place in Las Vegas, United States between 14 and 20 October 2019.

Singles main draw entrants

Seeds

 1 Rankings are as of October 7, 2019.

Other entrants
The following players received wildcards into the singles main draw:
  Alexander Cozbinov
  Steve Johnson
  Alex Kobelt
  Stefan Kozlov
  Evan Song

The following players received entry from the qualifying draw:
  Dennis Novikov
  Michail Pervolarakis

Champions

Singles

  Vasek Pospisil def.  James Duckworth 7–5, 6–7(11–13), 6–3.

Doubles

  Ruben Gonzales /  Ruan Roelofse def.  Nathan Pasha /  Max Schnur 2–6, 6–3, [10–8].

References

Las Vegas Challenger
Tennis in Las Vegas
2019 in American tennis
October 2019 sports events in the United States
Las Vegas Challenger
2019 in sports in Nevada